Alexander Ivanovich Tikhonov (born 2 January 1947) is a former Soviet-Russian biathlete. On 23 July 2007, he was found guilty of conspiracy to commit murder and sentenced to three years of imprisonment, but he was amnestied immediately and did not spend any time in prison.

Life and career
Tikhonov trained at Dynamo in Novosibirsk. He won nine world championship biathlon gold medals and four Olympic gold medals. He lacks an individual Olympic gold medal in his cupboard, but took part in the gold medal relay winning teams in 1968, 1972, 1976, and 1980.

He lived in Austria for several years in the early 2000s.

International Biathlon Union
In May 2002, he was chosen as vice president of the International Biathlon Union (IBU). A two-year investigation by the IBU found that in 2009 he reportedly offered a jewelry box to the IBU Secretary General in the hope that she wouldn’t pursue evidence of doping by Russian athletes.

Conspiracy to commit murder
In 2000, he was accused of participating in planning the murder of Kemerovo Oblast governor Aman Tuleyev. According to the prosecution, a businessman named Mikhail Zhivilo and his company MIKOM had a business conflict with Tuleyev, and Zhivilo decided to organize Tuleyev's murder as revenge. Zhivilo knew Tikhonov and, allegedly, asked him for help. Tikhonov got him in touch with his younger brother, Viktor Tikhonov, who found two potential killers—Vladimir Kharchenko and Sergey Nikanorov. Kharchenko and Nikanorov went to FSB and told them about the murder plans. Viktor Tikhonov was convicted in 2002 and sentenced to four years imprisonment. Since Alexander Tikhonov lived in Austria for several years, he was indicted separately from the other accused. On 23 July 2007, he was found guilty of conspiracy to commit murder and sentenced to three years of imprisonment. However, he was amnestied immediately and did not spend any time in prison.

Honours and awards
 Order of Lenin (1980)
 Order of the Red Banner of Labour (1976)
 Order of the Red Star (1969)
 Order of Friendship (1999)
 Medal "For Labour Valour" 
 Medal "For Distinguished Labour"

Biathlon results
All results are sourced from the International Biathlon Union.

Olympic Games
5 medals (4 gold, 1 silver)

*Sprint was added as an event in 1980.

World Championships
17 medals (11 gold, 4 silver, 2 bronze)

*During Olympic seasons competitions are only held for those events not included in the Olympic program.
**Sprint was added as an event in 1974.

Individual victories
2 victories (1 In, 1 Sp)

*Results are from UIPMB and IBU races which include the Biathlon World Cup, Biathlon World Championships and the Winter Olympic Games.

See also
List of multiple Olympic gold medalists in one event

References

External links
 
 Biography

1947 births
Living people
People from Chelyabinsk Oblast
Dynamo sports society athletes
Soviet male biathletes
Russian male biathletes
Biathletes at the 1968 Winter Olympics
Biathletes at the 1972 Winter Olympics
Biathletes at the 1976 Winter Olympics
Biathletes at the 1980 Winter Olympics
Olympic biathletes of the Soviet Union
Medalists at the 1968 Winter Olympics
Medalists at the 1972 Winter Olympics
Medalists at the 1976 Winter Olympics
Medalists at the 1980 Winter Olympics
Olympic medalists in biathlon
Olympic silver medalists for the Soviet Union
Olympic gold medalists for the Soviet Union
Biathlon World Championships medalists